Berikan (also Romanized as Berīkān and Barīkān; also known as Bārīku) is a village in Bu ol Kheyr Rural District, Delvar District, Tangestan County, Bushehr Province, Iran. At the 2006 census, its population was 218, in 58 families.

References 

Populated places in Tangestan County